Albert Ramos-Viñolas was the defending champion.

Seeds

Draw

Finals

Top half

Bottom half

References
 Main Draw
 Qualifying Draw

AON Open Challenger - Singles
AON Open Challenger
AON